Sublegatus is a genus of birds in the tyrant flycatcher family Tyrannidae.

The genus contains three species:

References

 
Bird genera
Taxa named by Philip Sclater
Taxa named by Osbert Salvin
Taxonomy articles created by Polbot